Sour Pie is a 1995 EP by Holly McNarland.

Track listing
"Stormy" (McNarland, Isfeld)
"Dad & I" (McNarland)
"Cry or Cum" (McNarland)
"Sick Boy" (McNarland)
"Mr. 5 Minutes" (McNarland)
"I Won't Stay" (McNarland)

References 

1996 debut EPs
Holly McNarland albums